Sir Arthur Clive Morrison-Bell, 1st Baronet (19 April 1871 – 16 April 1956), known as Clive Morrison-Bell, was a British soldier and Conservative Party parliamentarian.

Biography
Arthur was the son of Sir Charles William Bell and Louisa Maria Dawes.

He was educated at Eton and the Royal Military College, Sandhurst, and was commissioned in the Scots Guards in 1890. He served in the Boer War. In 1905, his father was created a Baronet. That same year the family assumed by Royal licence the additional surname and arms of Morrison in 1905, for Charles' mother, Mary Wilhelmina Morrison, the daughter and heiress of Royal Navy officer John Morrison.

Arthur was promoted Major in 1908, and retired from the army the same year.

At the general election of January 1910, Morrison-Bell was elected Member of Parliament (MP) for Honiton. In 1914, he rejoined the army at the beginning of the First World War, was captured in 1915 and returned to England in 1918.

Morrison-Bell held the seat without a break until 1931, when he retired due to ill-health. He was created a baronet in the 1923 Birthday Honours.

Personal life

In 1912 Morrison-Bell married Hon. Lilah Katherine Julia Wingfield, daughter of Mervyn Wingfield, 7th Viscount Powerscourt. They had two daughters, Shelagh and Patricia, with a third daughter dying in infancy. Shelagh married Sir Ralph Abercromby Campbell, Chief Justice of the Bahamas, in 1968.

The baronetcy became extinct when he died in 1956.

References

External links 
 
Parliamentary Archives, The Morrison-Bell Papers

1871 births
1956 deaths
People educated at Eton College
Scots Guards officers
British Army personnel of the Second Boer War
British Army personnel of World War I
World War I prisoners of war held by Germany
Baronets in the Baronetage of the United Kingdom
Conservative Party (UK) MPs for English constituencies
UK MPs 1910
UK MPs 1910–1918
UK MPs 1918–1922
UK MPs 1922–1923
UK MPs 1923–1924
UK MPs 1924–1929
UK MPs 1929–1931
British World War I prisoners of war
Younger sons of baronets
Graduates of the Royal Military College, Sandhurst
Members of the Parliament of the United Kingdom for Honiton